Cayla may refer to:

First name
Cayla George, Australian professional basketball player
Cayla Kluver, American author

Other uses
Cayla (grape)
My Friend Cayla, children's doll
Zoé Talon, comtesse du Cayla

See also
Kayla (disambiguation)